The Government of Hawaii is the governmental structure as established by the Constitution of Hawaii.

Government of Hawaii may also refer to:
Provisional Government of Hawaii, proclaimed after the coup d'état on January 17, 1893

Government of Hawaii may also refer to the governments of:

Ancient Hawaii
Kingdom of Hawaii
Republic of Hawaii
Territory of Hawaii

See also 
 Hawaii (disambiguation)